Dellen is a village in the commune of Grosbous located in western Luxembourg.  , the village has a population of 108.

Redange (canton)
Villages in Luxembourg